Valamram (1824–1886) was a prominent Hindu saint & social reformer of the 19th century from Gujarat, who was disciple of Bhoja Bhagat. He lived in Gariadhar. He was Guru-Bhai of Jalaram of Virpur.

Life 
Vala was born in year 1824 in Kunbi caste to Lavaji Narayan Katrodia &  Jabai. When he was of age he met Bhoja Bhagat of Fatehpur, who had earlier appeared in his dreams. Bhoja Bhagat made him his disciple and gave him the kanthi and name of Valamram.  In his later life started "Sadavrat" a free feeding center at Gariadhar in year 1870. He took live samadhi in year 1886. Even today, as per promise taken by Valamram from his Guru, Bhoja Bhagat, the Dhwaja to be hoisted atop the ashram of Bhoja Bhagat at Fatehpur, on birth celebration of Bhoja Bhagat is sent from Gariadhar by Valamram's Ashram. The Ashram and feeding center started by him in Gariadhar, is still doing their service to humanity. Hundreds of people, from various places, visit ashram & samadhi to pay their respects to the departed saint.

Recently, in January, 2012,  more than 150 years old four antique metal idols of Sri Krishna of religious significance, were stolen from Ashram. The idols were stolen by breaking the locks of the gate of temple inside the ashram. As per information given by presiding Mahant of Ashram, there is a folk-tale that two of the idols were said to have been presented to Valamramji by Lord Krishna, when he gave darshan to him. These idols were installed in temple inside ashram by the saint Valamramji himself. Other two idols were installed by Mahantas, who succeeded the ashram's gadi, after demise of saint Shri Valamram Bapu. However, after one day the idols were found lying inside a bag, left at the gate of Ashram. The two metal idols were found broken and two intact. There was a sense of relief and rejoice in the city after news of recovery of idols were announced by police. A procession was taken out, thereafter, by followers of Valamram Bapa & citizens to celebrate  recovery of idols.

References

19th-century Hindu religious leaders
1824 births
1886 deaths
Gujarati people
People from Bhavnagar district